Tenellia is a genus of sea slugs, aeolid nudibranchs, marine gastropod mollusks in the family Trinchesiidae.

Taxonomic history
This was a small genus until a DNA phylogeny of the former family Tergipedidae resulted in most species of Cuthona being transferred to this genus. 
Miller (2004) restricted the genus Cuthona Alder & Hancock, 1855 to the type species, C. nana (Alder & Hancock, 1842), and transferred to the genus Trinchesia the rest of the species previously included in Cuthona. Miller has been followed by some authors, and has not been followed by others - and there is currently much instability on the extension and contents of these two genera. Cella et al., 2016 hypothesised that the genus Tenellia should include many former Cuthona and Trinchesia species, with others being placed in new genera. Until the species listed here are re-investigated they are left by WoRMS in the genus Trinchesia. They also showed that the type taxon of Trinchesia is a species complex. The species were partly allocated to other genera as a result of another study, being placed in several smaller genera, Catriona, Diaphoreolis, Phestilla, Trinchesia and Zelentia.

Species 
Species within the genus Tenellia include:
 Tenellia adspersa  (Nordmann, 1845) - type species
 Tenellia fuscata  (Gould, 1870)
Species now moved to other genera include:

 Tenellia acinosa  (Risbec, 1928)
 Tenellia akibai  (Baba, 1984)
 Tenellia albocrusta  (MacFarland, 1966)
 Tenellia albopunctata  (Schmekel, 1968)
 Tenellia alpha  (Baba & Hamatani, 1963)
 Tenellia antarctica  (Pfeffer in Martens & Pfeffer, 1886)
 Tenellia anulata  (Baba, 1949)
 Tenellia barbadiana  (Edmunds & Just, 1983)
 Tenellia behrensi  (Hermosillo & Valdés, 2007)
 Tenellia beta  (Baba & Abe, 1964)
 Tenellia catachroma (Burn, 1963)
 Tenellia claviformis  (Vicente, 1974)
 Tenellia columbiana  (O'Donoghue, 1922)
 Tenellia correai  (Ortea, Caballer & Moro, 2002)
 Tenellia crinita  (Minichev, 1972)
 Tenellia destinyae  (Hermosillo & Valdés, 2007)
 Tenellia diminutiva  (Gosliner, 1980)
 Tenellia distans  (Odhner, 1922)
 Tenellia divanica (Martynov, 2002)
 Tenellia diversicolor  (Baba, 1975)
 Tenellia fidenciae  (Ortea, Moro & Espinosa, 1999)
 Tenellia foliata  (Forbes & Goodsir, 1839)
 Tenellia fructuosa  (Bergh, 1892)
 Tenellia futairo  (Baba, 1963)
 Tenellia genovae  (O'Donoghue, 1929)
 Tenellia georgiana  (Pfeffer in Martens & Pfeffer, 1886)
 Tenellia giarannae  (Valdés, Moran & Woods, 2012 )
 Tenellia granosa  (Schmekel, 1966)
 Tenellia gymnota  (Couthouy, 1838)
 Tenellia hamanni  (Behrens, 1987)
 Tenellia henrici  (Eliot, 1916)
 Tenellia herrerai  (Ortea, Moro & Caballer, 2002)
 Tenellia ilonae  (Schmekel, 1968)
 Tenellia iris  (Edmunds & Just, 1983)
 Tenellia kanga  (Edmunds, 1970)
 Tenellia kuiteri  (Rudman, 1981)
 Tenellia lenkae  (Martynov, 2002)
 Tenellia leopardina  (Vayssière, 1888)
 Tenellia lizae  (Angulo-Campillo & Valdés, 2003)
 Tenellia longi  (Behrens, 1985)
 Tenellia luciae  (Valdés, Medrano & Bhave, 2016)
 Tenellia lugubris  (Bergh, 1870)
 Tenellia macquariensis  (Burn, 1973)
 Tenellia maua  (Er. Marcus & Ev. Marcus, 1960)
 Tenellia melanobrachia  (Bergh, 1874)
 Tenellia millenae  (Hermosillo & Valdés, 2007)
 Tenellia miniostriata  (Schmekel, 1968)
 Tenellia minor  (Rudman, 1981)
 Tenellia netsica  (Er. Marcus & Ev. Marcus, 1960)
 Tenellia ocellata  (Schmekel, 1966)
 Tenellia odhneri  (Er. Marcus, 1959)
 Tenellia ornata  (Baba, 1937)
 Tenellia pallida  (Eliot, 1906)
 Tenellia paucicirra  (Minichev, 1972)
 Tenellia perca  (Er. Marcus, 1958)
 Tenellia phoenix  (Gosliner, 1981)
 Tenellia pinnifera  (Baba, 1949)
 Tenellia puellula  (Baba, 1955)
 Tenellia pumilio  (Bergh, 1871)
 Tenellia punicea  (Millen, 1986)
 Tenellia pupillae (Baba, 1961)
 Tenellia pusilla  (Bergh, 1898)
 Tenellia reflexa (Miller, 1977)
 Tenellia riosi  (Hermosillo & Valdés, 2008)
 Tenellia rolleri  (Gosliner & Behrens, 1988)
 Tenellia rubra  (Edmunds, 1964)
 Tenellia rutila  (MacFarland, 1966 as Cratena rutila)
 Tenellia scintillans  (Miller, 1977)
 Tenellia sibogae  (Bergh, 1905)
 Tenellia sororum (Burn, 1964)
 Tenellia spadix  (MacFarland, 1966 as Cratena spadix)
 Tenellia speciosa  (Macnae, 1954)
 Tenellia suecica  (Odhner, 1940)
 Tenellia taita (Edmunds, 1970)
 Tenellia thelmae (Burn, 1964)
 Tenellia thompsoni  (Garcia, Lopez-Gonzalez & Garcia-Gomez, 1991)
 Tenellia tina  (Er. Marcus, 1957)
 Tenellia valentini  (Eliot, 1907)
 Tenellia veronicae  (A. E. Verrill, 1880)
 Tenellia virens  (MacFarland, 1966)
 Tenellia viridiana (Burn, 1962)
 Tenellia willani  (Cervera, Garcia-Gomez & Lopez-Gonzalez, 1992)
 Tenellia yamasui  (Hamatani, 1993)
 Tenellia zelandica  (Odhner, 1924)

References 

Trinchesiidae
Taxa named by Achille Costa